The Trebeș is a right tributary of the river Bistrița in Romania. It discharges into the Bistrița in Bacău.

References

Rivers of Romania
Rivers of Bacău County